The 2004 Spanish Grand Prix (officially the Formula 1 Gran Premio Marlboro de España 2004) was a Formula One motor race held on 9 May 2004 at the Circuit de Catalunya, Montmeló, Spain. It was Race 5 of 18 in the 2004 FIA Formula One World Championship. The 66-lap race was won by Michael Schumacher for the Ferrari team. His teammate Rubens Barrichello finished second with Jarno Trulli third in a Renault car.

Report

Background
Heading into the fifth race of the season, Ferrari driver Michael Schumacher was leading the World Drivers' Championship with 40 points; Rubens Barrichello was second on 24 points, 16 points behind Schumacher. Behind Schumacher and Barrichello in the Drivers' Championship, BAR driver Jenson Button was third on 23 points, with Juan Pablo Montoya and Fernando Alonso on 18 and 16 points respectively. In the World Constructors' Championship, Ferrari were leading on 64 points and Renault were second on 31 points, with Williams third on 27 points.

Friday drivers
The bottom 6 teams in the 2003 Constructors' Championship were entitled to run a third car in free practice on Friday. These drivers drove on Friday but did not compete in qualifying or the race.

Practice and qualifying
Four practice sessions were held before the Sunday race—two on Friday, and two on Saturday. The Friday morning and afternoon sessions each lasted an hour. The third and final practice sessions were held on Saturday morning and lasted 45 minutes.

The qualifying session was run as a one-lap session and took place on Friday and Saturday afternoon. The cars were run one at a time; the Friday running order was determined with the Championship leading heading out first. The Saturday running order was determined by times set in Friday afternoon qualifying with the fastest heading out last and the slowest running first. The lap times from the Friday afternoon session did not determine the grid order.

Race
The race started at 14:00 local time. During the warm-up lap of the race, a man calling himself Jimmy Jump ran through the starting grid, only to be apprehended soon by the security. While he claimed to have many fans (due to his other performances at football matches), he was criticized for risking the lives of the drivers, even though the cars were still travelling at low speed at this point.

Michael Schumacher dominated a largely uneventful race leading home his team-mate Rubens Barrichello. The most notable result was that of the McLaren team, with their drivers Kimi Räikkönen and David Coulthard finishing a lap down and outside of the points scoring positions, a far cry from their usual championship-contending performance.

Classification

Qualifying

Race

Championship standings after the race 

Drivers' Championship standings

Constructors' Championship standings

Note: Only the top five positions are included for both sets of standings.

References 

Spanish Grand Prix
Spanish Grand Prix
Grand Prix
Spanish Grand Prix